The 2009 Brigham municipal election was held on November 1, 2009, to elect a mayor and councillors in Brigham, Quebec. All incumbents were re-elected without opposition.

Results

Steven Neil was first elected as mayor of Brigham in 1999, defeating incumbent mayor André Leroux. He was re-elected without opposition in 2003, 2005, and 2009. Neil took part in merger negotiations with the mayors of Bromont, Cowansville, and East Farnham in 2001; ultimately, the communities remained separate.

Source: Official results, Government of Quebec

References

2009 Quebec municipal elections